Children of Forever is the debut album by jazz fusion bassist Stanley Clarke. It was recorded in December 1972, and was released in 1973 by Polydor Records. On the album, Clarke is joined by vocalists Dee Dee Bridgewater and Andy Bey, flutist Arthur Webb, guitarist Pat Martino, keyboardist Chick Corea, and drummer Lenny White.

Reception

In a review for AllMusic, Thom Jurek wrote: "Children of Forever has aged exceedingly well, and sounds as warm, inviting, and full of possibility in the early 21st century as it did in the early '70s. It's full of heart, soul, passion, and truly inspired musicianship."

Billboard included the recording in their "Top Album Picks," and a reviewer stated: "Avant-garde meets funk on this connecting bridge type of project in which Andy Bey's fine voice is heard to advantage and Chick Corea's electric piano tinkles superbly."

Noting the presence of Corea and White on the album, Progrography's Dave Connolly commented: "As a warm run for the next iteration of RTF..., Children of Forever is a welcome find for fusion fans."

Track listing
All tracks composed by Stanley Clarke and lyrics written by Neville Potter; except where indicated

Side One
 "Children of Forever" – 10:42
 "Unexpected Days" – 5:53
 "Bass Folk Song" (Clarke) – 7:59

Side Two
 "Butterfly Dreams" – 6:52
 "Sea Journey" (Chick Corea, Neville Potter)– 16:26

Personnel
 Stanley Clarke – double bass, bass guitar
 Chick Corea – electric piano, piano, clavinet
 Pat Martino – electric guitar, 12-string guitar
 Lenny White – drums, tambourine
 Arthur Webb – flute
 Dee Dee Bridgewater – vocals
 Andy Bey – vocals

Production

Chick Corea - Producer
Leslie Wynn - Assistant Producer
Dixon Van Winkle – Engineer
Brad Davis - Assistant Engineer

References

1973 debut albums
Post-bop albums
Stanley Clarke albums
Polydor Records albums